Zigzag Island is a small island close off the south coast of Tower Island, Palmer Archipelago. The name applied by United Kingdom Antarctic Place-Names Committee (UK-APC) is descriptive of the island in plan; it is deeply indented, with steep cliff faces.

See also 
 Composite Antarctic Gazetteer
 List of Antarctic and sub-Antarctic islands
 List of Antarctic islands south of 60° S
 SCAR
 Territorial claims in Antarctica

Map
 Trinity Peninsula. Scale 1:250000 topographic map No. 5697. Institut für Angewandte Geodäsie and British Antarctic Survey, 1996.

References

External links 

Islands of the Palmer Archipelago